Ariane Maier (born 10 Oktober 1981) is an Austrian handball player. She competed in the women's tournament at the 2000 Summer Olympics.

References

1981 births
Living people
Austrian female handball players
Olympic handball players of Austria
Handball players at the 2000 Summer Olympics
People from Bregenz
Sportspeople from Vorarlberg